Gooloogongia is a genus of prehistoric lobe-finned fish which belonged to the group of rhizodont fishes. Gooloogongia lived during the Late Devonian period (Famennian stage, about 360 million years ago). Fossils have been found in the Canowindra site, (Australia). It was named by Zerina Johanson and Per Ahlberg in 1998. In general size and shape Gooloogongia is similar to the modern saratoga which lives in the tropical rivers of northern Australia.

Gooloogongia loomesi ("Loomes' Gooloogong") named after Bruce Loomes, the foreman of the 1993 excavation of the Canowindra site, and the town of Gooloogong, NSW.

Description
Gooloogongia was large in size (about 90 cm). Like other lobe-finned fishes, Gooloogongia had two rows of teeth in the jaw, the outer row being small teeth, and the inner row being larger fangs. The fangs of Gooloogongia are sharp and needle-like, but they were probably not strong enough to penetrate the armor plating of small placoderms.

References

External links
 Gooloogongia loomesi
 Specimens of Gooloogongia loomesi
 Morphology of ?Sauripteris, Gooloogongia, Panderichthys and Acanthostega
 Reconstruction of Gooloogongia loomesi
 Devonian rhizodontids and tristichopterids from East Gondwana

Late Devonian fish
Devonian bony fish
Prehistoric lobe-finned fish genera
Rhizodonts